Enrique Fernando Ortiz Moruno (born 2 July 1977), known simply as Enrique, is a Spanish former footballer who played as a right winger.

He played mainly with Cádiz in his professional career, representing the club in all three major levels of Spanish football.

Club career
Born in Azuaga, Province of Badajoz, Enrique spent his first seven years as a senior in the third division (one season also in the fourth with CP Cacereño, where he scored 38 goals to help his team to achieve promotion), signing with Cádiz CF in January 2004. After a slow first season he became a very important attacking unit for the Andalusians, netting twice in 28 games in his second year, en route to a La Liga promotion.

Enrique made his Spanish top-flight debut on 28 August 2005 in a 1–2 home loss to Real Madrid at the age of 28, and scored his first goal on 23 October as the game's only against Athletic Bilbao at the Estadio Ramón Carranza. He only missed two matches during the campaign but Cádiz were immediately relegated back, and he continued to represent the club until his retirement in June 2012 at nearly 35, in the second and third tiers.

References

External links

Stats and bio at Cadistas1910 

1977 births
Living people
People from Campiña Sur (Badajoz)
Sportspeople from the Province of Badajoz
Spanish footballers
Footballers from Extremadura
Association football wingers
La Liga players
Segunda División players
Segunda División B players
Tercera División players
CP Cacereño players
Algeciras CF footballers
Motril CF players
Cádiz CF players